John Turner Whitted is an electrical engineer and computer scientist who introduced recursive ray tracing to the computer graphics community with his 1979 paper "An improved illumination model for shaded display". His algorithm proved to be a practical method of simulating global illumination, inspired many variations, and is in wide use today. Simple recursive implementations of ray tracing are still occasionally referred to as Whitted-style ray tracing.

Early life and education
Whitted was born in Durham, North Carolina and grew up in Winston-Salem.

Whitted took his BSE and MS degrees in electrical engineering from Duke University, then received his PhD from North Carolina State University in 1978 and joined Bell Labs.

Career
In December 1983, Whitted co-founded computer graphics technology firm Numerical Design Limited (NDL) with Dr. Robert Whitton. Whitted would serve as president and technical director at NDL until 1996, and continue as a director of the company until NDL's merger with Emergent Game Technologies in 2005.

He later worked at Microsoft Research, and in 2014 joined NVidia Research.

Whitted is currently an Adjunct Research Professor at the University of North Carolina at Chapel Hill, and Adjunct Professor at North Carolina State University.

He is a member of the National Academy of Engineering and was awarded the Steven Anson Coons Award for Outstanding Creative Contributions to Computer Graphics in 2013.

References 

Year of birth missing (living people)
Living people
North Carolina State University alumni
21st-century American engineers
University of North Carolina at Chapel Hill faculty
Scientists at Bell Labs
Members of the United States National Academy of Engineering
Duke University alumni
Microsoft employees
Nvidia people